The University Women's Club of Toronto is a Canadian organization that was founded in 1903 to promote women's education. Its parent organization is Canadian Federation of University Women.

External links

Canadian Federation of University Women (CFUW)

Organizations established in 1903
Women's organizations based in Canada
Organizations based in Toronto
Educational organizations based in Ontario
Women in Ontario